The 1991 IBF World Championships (World Badminton Championships) were held in Copenhagen, Denmark, in 1991. Following the results of the women's doubles.

Qualification
 Sonja Mellink / Nicole van Hooren -  Cristina González / Dolores Marco: 15-3, 15-4 
 Tomomi Matsuo / Kyoko Sasage -  Cheng Yin Sat / Wong Chun Fan: 15-4, 15-1
 Chen Hsiao-Li / Shyu Yu-Ling -  Kim Myong Sun / Kim Song Ok: 15-7, 15-3
 Tan Lee Wai / Tan Sui Hoon -  Chiu Mei Yin / Chung Hoi Yuk: 15-3, 15-12
 Catherine / Eliza Nathanael -  Silvia Albrecht /  Lisa Campbell: 15-7, 15-3
 Tammy Jenkins / Rhona Robertson -  Sandra Dimbour / Elodie Mansuy: 15-9, 15-11
 Kang Chia-I / Lee Chien-Mei -  Rachel Bain / Christine Charles: w.o.

Main stage

Section 1

Section 2

Section 3

Section 4

Final stage

References
http://www.tournamentsoftware.com/sport/events.aspx?id=D35444A5-8F1F-4B92-8ACA-39FE076F5602

1991 IBF World Championships
IBF